Cercyon (Cercyon) nigriceps, is a species of water scavenger beetle with cosmopolitan distribution from Palaearctic, Nearctic, Afrotropical, Oriental and Neotropical regional countries.

Description
Body oval with slightly convex and shiny dorsum without microsculpture. Head is black whereas clypeus is linear, and truncate anteriorly. Head and pronotum with fine and dense punctuations. Maxillary palpi are yellowish to brownish yellow in color with darker ultimate segment. Antennae yellowish to brownish. Pronotum transverse and brownish, where the anterior side and lateral margins are brownish yellow or yellow. Scutellum brownish, with very finely and sparsely punctuations. Elytra yellow or brownish yellow in color with nine complete deep and one short punctate stria. Elytal intervals are shallow and with fine, regular punctations. Ventrum dark brown or black. Proventrite is tectiform, and finely carinate medially. Epipleura is flat, and horizontal. Metasternal pentagon is flat, and shiny, with very dense shallow punctuations. Legs are yellowish or brownish yellow with much paler tarsi.

Adults are frequently found from horse dung, cow dung and other mammalian excreta as well as in rotting plants.

Distribution
It is found in following countries: Austria, Azores, Belarus, Britain, Canary Islands, Croatia, Czech Republic, Slovakia, Denmark, Estonia, Finland, France, Germany, Hungary, Ireland, Italy, Japan, Latvia, Lithuania, Madeira, Malta, the Netherlands, Norway, Poland, Portugal, Romania, Russia, Sweden, Switzerland, Tunisia, Ukraine, Canada, USA, Jamaica, Lesser Antilles (Tobago), Panama, Paraguay, Argentina, Botswana, Gambia, Madagascar, Mascarene islands, Namibia, Rwanda, Saudi Arabia, Seychelles, Tanzania, Democratic Republic of the Congo, Bhutan, Nepal, China, Taiwan, India, Sri Lanka, Vietnam, Laos, Thailand, Indonesia, Philippines.

Synonyms
Due to the large geographical range and difficulty in identification, several taxonomical descriptions and revisions have been recorded.

 Dermestes nigriceps Marsham, 1802
 Sphaeridium melanocephalus var. nigriceps Marsham, 1802
 Dermestes atricapillus Marsham, 1802
 Dermestes melanocephalus var. atricapillus (Marsham, 1802)
 Cercyon atricapillum (Marsham, 1802)
 Cercyon nigriceps var. atricapillum (Marsham, 1802)
 Dermestes laevis Marsham, 1802
 Cercyon laeve (Marsham, 1802)
 Dermestes inustus Marsham, 1802
 Cercyon inustum (Marsham, 1802)
 Sphaeridium centrimaculatum Sturm, 1807
 Cercyon centrimaculatum (Sturm, 1807)
 Cambrus centromaculatus Sturm, 1807
 Cercyon (s. str.) nigriceps var. centrimaculatum (Sturm, 1807)
 Cercyon nigriceps ab. centromaculatus (Sturm, 1807)
 Cercyon atriceps Stephens, 1829
 Cercyon nigriceps var. atriceps Stephens, 1839
 Cercyon ustulatum Stephens, 1829
 Cercyon bimaculatum Stephens, 1829
 Cercyon testaceum Stephens, 1829
 Cercyon nubilipenne Stephens, 1835
 Cercyon troglodytes Dejean, 1836
 Cercyon pulchellum Heer, 1841
 Cercyon mundum Melsheimer, 1844
 Cercyon vicinale Walker, 1859
 Cercyon nigriceps Motschulsky, 1863
 Cercyon nigriceps ab. simplex Delahon, 1913
 Cercyon atricapillus (Marsham, 1802)
 Cercyon nigriceps (Marsham, 1802)

References

Hydrophilidae
Insects of Sri Lanka
Insects described in 1802